EBH may refer to:

 Early Biblical Hebrew (EBH)
 El Bayadh Airport, in Algeria
 Ellis, Beggs & Howard, an English rock band
 Emergency Behavioral Health (Pennsylvania Department of Human Services)
 Erling Braut Haaland, Norwegian footballer
 Extra-base hit
 Cyrillic script for:
 EVN AD Skopje, a power company in North Macedonia
 , a power company